Huilongpu Town is a rural town in Ningxiang City, Hunan Province, China.

Administrative division
The town is divided into six villages and one community: 
 Houzhiting Community
 Huilongpu
 Jinyu
 Fengshou
 Baijin
 Jinwang
 Yanhe()

Geography
The Wei River, known as "Mother River" and a tributary of the Xiang River, flows through the town.

Economy
Watermelon is important to the economy.

Culture
Huaguxi is the most influence local theater.

Transport
The Provincial Highway S209 and County Road X091 runs east to west through the town.

The County Road X092 travels northwest, intersecting with Provincial Highway S206 at Wumuchong.

The Longjiang Avenue passes across the town north to south.

Attractions
Local specialties include apples.

References

Divisions of Ningxiang
Ningxiang